Lost in Sound is a studio album by American multi-instrumentalist Yusef Lateef released in 1961 by the Charlie Parker label. This record is the Yusef Lateef's only album for the label. Since its initial release, the album has been re-released several times via multiple labels.

Track listing

Personnel 
Musicians
 Yusef Lateef – tenor saxophone
 Ray McKinny – bass
 Clifford Jarvis – drums (tracks: 1, 2, 4–6, 8)
 George Scott – drums (tracks: 3, 7)
 Vincent Pitts – trumpet
 John Harmon – piano

Production
 Peter Ind – engineer
 Doris Parker – liner notes
 Aubrey Mayhew – producer

References 

Yusef Lateef albums
1962 albums